The Blues Is Alive and Well is the 18th studio album by American blues musician Buddy Guy.  It was released on June 15, 2018 by RCA/Silvertone Records.

The Blues Is Alive and Well won the Grammy Award for Best Traditional Blues Album at the 61st Grammy Awards.

Keith Richards and Jeff Beck play guitar on the song "Cognac", and Mick Jagger plays harmonica on the song "You Did the Crime". The front cover photograph was taken by Chuck Lanza at State Highway 1,
Lettsworth, Louisiana where Guy was born in 1936.

Critical reception
In DownBeat, Bobby Reed wrote, "... Guy delivers what one would expect from an 81-year-old elder statesman (albeit one who performs like someone half his age). This album is filled with Guy's trademark, stinging electric guitar solos – each packing enough power to peel paint off a house. Guy's guitar heroics attract so much attention that his vocal prowess has long been underrated, and his voice remains in superb shape, a supple instrument with impressive range."

On AllMusic, Stephen Thomas Erlewine said, "The Blues Is Alive and Well is full of songs charged with mortality.... [The album]  has a lot of songs in general – a full 15, lasting well over an hour. This excessive length means there's a lot of room for levity, too, including James Bay sitting in for a duet on "Blue No More", Mick Jagger's wailing harp on "You Did the Crime", and, best of all, a showdown with Keith Richards and Jeff Beck on "Cognac"."

In Blues Blast, Mark Thompson wrote, "Throughout his career, Buddy Guy has been known for his guitar prowess. Oftentimes, his skill as a singer would slide by with little notice. On this release, he consistently reaches into the emotional depths, often with bone-chilling intensity, conveying hard-earned lessons on life and the people you meet along the way."

On Rock and Blues Muse, Dave Resto said, "It was a lifetime ago when the Lettsworth, Louisiana native followed his dreams and moved to Chicago to make his fortune. There, he worked as the house guitarist at Chess Records where he formed musical alliances with Muddy Waters and Junior Wells and went on to influence generations of legendary guitarists. Today, the 81-year-old Guy boasts a long list of accomplishments in the music industry. The Blues Is Alive and Well is Guy's assertion that both he and the genre still have a lot to say."

Track listing

"Milking Muther for Ya" contains a portion of "Mother Fuyer" written by Red Nelson.

Personnel
Musicians
Buddy Guy – lead guitar, vocals
Rob McNelley – rhythm guitar, slide guitar
Kevin McKendree – keyboards: Electric piano [Wurlitzer], Organ [B3] (1), Mellotron (4), Upright piano (2, 3, 5, 6, 8), Clavinet (7)
Willie Weeks – bass
Tom Hambridge – drums
Tommy MacDonald – Bass (6)
Horns – The Muscle Shoals Horns*
Baritone Saxophone – Jim Hoke (4)
Tenor Saxophone – Doug Moffet (4)
James Bay – Vocals, Guitar (6)
Mick Jagger – harmonica (8)
Production
Produced by Tom Hambridge
Recording: Ducky Carlisle
Mixing: Michael Saint-Leon, Tom Hambridge
Mastering: Greg Calbi at Sterling Sound
Art direction, design: Jeff Schulz
Photography: Chuck Lanza, Paul Natkin

Charts

References

2018 albums
Buddy Guy albums
RCA Records albums
Albums produced by Tom Hambridge